Involutional melancholia or involutional depression is a traditional name for a psychiatric disorder affecting mainly elderly or late middle-aged people, usually accompanied with paranoia. It is classically defined as "depression of gradual onset occurring during the involutional years (40-55 in women and 50-65 in men), with symptoms of marked anxiety, agitation, restlessness, somatic concerns, hypochondriasis, occasional somatic or nihilistic delusions, insomnia, anorexia, and weight loss." Involutional melancholia is not recognized as a psychiatric disorder by the DSM-5, the American Psychiatric Association's (APA) classification and diagnostic tool.

Signs and symptoms
Hodophobia is a specific phobia as classified in the DSM-5.

Involutional melancholy's 'course was chronic, with agitation, depersonalization and delusions of bodily change and guilt' featuring strongly, but 'without manic features'. Symptoms of fear are also considered to occur, as well as despondency and hypochondriacal delusions. The late onset of the disorder was matched with a prolonged course with poor prognosis and/or deterioration, in the absence of treatment.

Treatments
Involutional melancholia is classically treated with antidepressants and mood elevators.

Electroconvulsive therapy may also be used. Mid-century, there was a consensus that the technique indeed 'yields the best results in the long-lasting depressions of the change of life, the so-called "involutional melancholias", which before this form of treatment was introduced often required years of hospitalization'. The 21st century also records 'an excellent and rapid clinical response found in melancholia of recent onset...in older rather than younger patients' with ECT

Psychoanalysis

Otto Fenichel considered that 'psychoanalytically, not much is known about the structure and mechanism of involutional melancholias; they seem to occur in personalities with an outspoken compulsive character of an especially rigid nature. In the climacterium the compulsive defensive systems fail'.

History
Emil Kraepelin (1907) was the first to describe involutional melancholia as a distinct clinical entity separate from the manic-depressive psychosis, arguing that 'the processes of involution in the body are suited to engender mournful or anxious moodiness'. Right up until 'the seventh edition of his textbook Kraepelin considered involutional melancholia as a separate disease', of acquired origin, but (partly in response to Dreyfus) 'he decided to include it in the eighth edition under the general heading of manic depressive insanity'.

Dreyfus (1907) had challenged Kraepelin's concept of an acquired origin, maintaining it to be endogenous in origin - although 'a recent statistical study of Dreyfus's old series has also shown that his conclusion that the natural history of involutional melancholia was no different from that of depression affecting younger subjects was wrong'. Kirby (1909) described it as a distinctive syndrome, as did Hoch and MacCurdy in 1922. Titley (1936) described the premorbid personality and narrow range of interests, etc., Kallman (1959) found incidence of schizophrenia in the families of such patients.

Debate about causation - endogenous or environmental - as well as its status as a clinical entity continued into the late twentieth century. Some contend that whereas 'involutional melancholy was conceptualized as an acquired rather than constitutional disorder, these ideas have not survived careful scrutiny'. R. P. Brown in 1984 maintained that 'there is insufficient evidence to view involutional melancholy as a separate clinical entity', but at the same time that 'clinical characteristics of patients with unipolar endogenous depression may be influenced by age'.

See also

Geriatric psychiatry
Late life depression

References

Further reading
 Moses R. Kaufmann, "Psychoanalysis in Late-Life Depression", Psychoanalytic Quarterly vi (1937)

Depression (mood)